Paulo Ramos may refer to:
Paulo Ramos, Maranhão, a municipality in the state of Maranhão in the Northeast region of Brazil.
Paulo Rafael de Oliveira Ramos (1985–2009), a Brazilian midfielder.